Lamar is an at-grade light rail station on the W Line of the RTD Rail system. It is located near the intersection of West 13th Avenue and Lamar Street, after which the station is named, in Lakewood, Colorado.

The station opened on April 26, 2013, on the West Corridor, built as part of the Regional Transportation District (RTD) FasTracks public transportation expansion plan and voter-approved sales tax increase for the Denver metropolitan area.

The area around Lamar station has seen transit-oriented development, including three joint housing and retail buildings.

References 

Transportation in Lakewood, Colorado
RTD light rail stations
W Line (RTD)
Railway stations in the United States opened in 2013
2013 establishments in Colorado
Transportation buildings and structures in Jefferson County, Colorado